William Stuart Reyburn (December 17, 1882 – July 25, 1946) was a Republican member of the U.S. House of Representatives from Pennsylvania.

Background 
Reyburn was born in Philadelphia, Pennsylvania, to Margretta (nee Crozier) and John E. Reyburn, a former mayor of Philadelphia. He attended Hill High School in Pottstown, Pennsylvania He graduated from Yale University in 1904, where he was a member of St. Anthony Hall He graduated from the University of Pennsylvania Law School in 1907.

Career 
Reyburn was admitted to the Bar in 1908 and practiced law in and Philadelphia, Pennsylvania and Washington, D.C. In 1905, he was a member of President William Howard Taft's party that visited the Philippines, Japan, and China.

He was twice elected to the Pennsylvania House of Representatives from 1909-1910 and 1911-1912 as a Republican but resigned on May 25, 1911. As a legislator, he backed the Pension Bill which gave state funds to veterans of the Civil War from Pennsylvania.

May 23, 1911, he was elected to the 62nd Congress to fill the vacancy caused by the death of Joel Cook. He served in Congress from May 23, 1911 to March 3, 1913. He declined to be a candidate for renomination in 1912.

Personal 
On June 10, 1911, Reyburn married Georgie Fontaine Maury, of Washington, D.C. He later married Martha Gardner. They lived at 1829 Spring Garden Street in Philadelphia and had two sons: John E. Reyburn and Maury Reyburm. He was an Episcopalian and a member of the Racket Club in Philadelphia, the Freemasons and the Union League.

After Congress, Reyburn retired from active business pursuits. He retired to Aiken, South Carolina, and later moved to his estate "Black Hill" in Old Lyme, Connecticut. He died on July 25, 1946 in New Haven, Connecticut and was interred at Laurel Hill Cemetery in Philadelphia.

References

Republican Party members of the Pennsylvania House of Representatives
Georgetown University Law Center alumni
Yale University alumni
The Hill School alumni
Politicians from Philadelphia
1882 births
1946 deaths
Republican Party members of the United States House of Representatives from Pennsylvania
Burials at Laurel Hill Cemetery (Philadelphia)
20th-century American politicians